The Torneo Gran Alternativa (2013) was a professional wrestling tournament event produced by Consejo Mundial de Lucha Libre (CMLL) that took place from April 12 until April 26, 2013 over the course of two CMLL Super Viernes shows, with the finals on the Arena Mexico 57th Anniversary Show. The Torneo Gran Alternativa (Spanish for "the Great Alternative tournament) concept sees a Novato or rookie team up with an experienced wrestler for a tag team tournament. The rookie winner is often elevated up the ranks of CMLL as a result of winning the tournament, but there is no specific "prize" for winning the tournament. The tournament was won by rookie Boby Zavala and veteran Rey Escorpión, Escorpión's second tournament win overall.

History
Starting in 1994 the Mexican professional wrestling promotion Consejo Mundial de Lucha Libre (CMLL) created a special tournament concept where they would team up a novato, or rookie, with a veteran for a single-elimination tag team tournament. The tournament was called El Torneo Gran Alternativa, or "The Great Alternative Tournament" and became a recurring event on the CMLL calendar. CMLL did not hold a Gran Alternativa tournament in 1997 and 2000 held on each year from 2001 through 2013. The 2013 Gran Alternativa tournament was the 19th overall Gran Alternativa tournament. All tournaments have been held in Arena México.

Tournament background
The tournament features 15 professional wrestling matches with different wrestlers teaming up, some of which may be involved in pre-existing scripted feuds or storylines while others are simply paired up for the tournament. Wrestlers portray either villains (referred to as Rudos in Mexico) or fan favorites (Técnicos in Mexico) as they compete in wrestling matches with pre-determined outcomes. The tournament format follows CMLL's traditional tournament formats, with two qualifying blocks of eight teams that compete on the first and second week of the tournament and a final match between the two block winners. The qualifying blocks were one-fall matches while the tournament finals will be a best two-out-of-three falls tag team match. Each qualifying block started with all 8 Novatos competing in a "seeding" battle royal to determine the brackets for the block.

2013 Gran Alternativa participants

Out of all the Novato participants only Hombre Bala Jr. and Boby Zavala had participated in the Gran Alternativa tournament before, having both participated in the 2012 version. Hombre Bala Jr. had teamed up with Marco Corleone, only to lose in their first match to the team of Atlantis and Tritón. Zavala had been teamed up with Rey Bucanero, but had also lost in the first round, to the team of Dragon Lee and Rush. Sensei and Camaleón are included in the Novato group even though they were not truly rookies, having been professional wrestlers for over a decade each and having used their current ring characters in CMLL since 2005 and 2007 respectively.

Tournament results

Super Viernes events

April 12, 2013

April 19, 2013

April 26, 2013

References

2013 in professional wrestling
CMLL Torneo Gran Alternativa
April 2013 events in Mexico